How Long Will You Live? is a television series broadcast on RTÉ One. Presented by Mark Hamilton, each week Hamilton examines a different individual with an unhealthy lifestyle, estimates their lifespan and attempts to increase that lifespan by implementing his own techniques into a plan to improve that person's lifestyle. A fourth series began airing on 7 January 2009. The series is sponsored by Flora.

Episode list

Series one 
The first series contained six episodes.

Series two
The second series contained eight episodes. The eight unhealthy individuals were revisited before the fourth series and their progress was filmed for a series titled How Long Will You Live? Revisited. One of these was a priest.

Series three
The third series contained ten episodes. Two couples featured in series three, meaning that twelve unhealthy individuals were featured overall. The third series saw the programme become more multicultural by featuring an unhealthy individual who was originally from Nigeria and another unhealthy individual who was originally from a small village in southern India.

References

External links
 Official site

2000s Irish television series
Irish makeover television series
RTÉ original programming